The 2004 Oceania Youth Athletics Championships were held at the Townsville Sports Reserve in Townsville, Australia, between December 16–18, 2004. They were held together with the 2004 Oceania Open Championships.
A total of 35 events were contested, 18 by boys and 17 by girls.

Medal summary
Medal winners can be found on the Athletics Weekly website. Complete results can be found on webpages of the World Junior Athletics History, and of the Ligue de Nouvelle Calédonie Athlétisme (LNCA).

Boys under 18 (Youth)

Girls under 18 (Youth)

Medal table (unofficial)

Participation (unofficial)
An unofficial count yields the number of about 135 athletes from 19 countries:

 (8)
 (32)
 (5)
 (3)
 (4)
 (5)
 (6)
 (2)
 (5)
 (10)
 (16)
 (3)
 (4)
 (2)
 (9)
 (5)
 (6)
 (8)
 (2)

References

Oceania Youth Athletics Championships
International athletics competitions hosted by Australia
Oceanian U18 Championships
2004 in Australian sport
Youth sport in Australia
2004 in youth sport
December 2004 sports events in Australia